The Phoenix Points of Pride are 33 landmarks and attractions in Phoenix, Arizona, selected by voters since 1992 to represent the city's best features for residents and visitors. They include structures, such as St. Mary's Basilica, the Phoenix Zoo and Footprint Center; and natural formations such as Camelback Mountain and Hole-in-the-Rock at Papago Park.

The first 25 Points of Pride were selected in 1992. The program was seen as a way to boost civic morale in the wake of negative national publicity for Phoenix in the wake of the Martin Luther King Jr. holiday controversy. Cricket Wireless Pavilion and the Deer Valley Rock Art Center were added in 1996 and 2000 respectively, and the Japanese Friendship Garden, Ben Avery Shooting Facility and the Thomas J. Pappas School were selected in 2004. Arizona State University at the West Campus, Burton Barr Central Library and Cutler-Plotkin Jewish Heritage Center (the area's first Jewish synagogue) are the most recent Points of Pride, selected in 2008.

The Phoenix Pride Commission maintains the list of Phoenix Points of Pride and promoting these unique metropolitan area resources. In the past, the commission accepted nominations from the residents and selected locations for the Points of Pride ballot. The residents voted for these locations and the commission determined how many of the locations receiving the greatest number of votes were designated as a Point of Pride.

In July 2008, Phoenix mayor Phil Gordon changed the Phoenix Pride Commission to an ad hoc commission, meaning that it will meet more infrequently to save money; this could mean the effective end of the Points of Pride program.

List
This list shows information about each of the Phoenix Points of Pride.

See also

 List of historic properties in Phoenix, Arizona

References

External links
 City of Phoenix website: Phoenix Points of Pride